Shadow Cabinet of Ramūnas Karbauskis is the 2nd Shadow Cabinet of Lithuania. It consists of the current Shadow Prime Minister Ramūnas Karbauskis who is the Head of Shadow Government, and 14 shadow government ministers from the Lithuanian Farmers and Greens Union.

History 
On 26 January, Chairman of Farmers and Greens Union Ramūnas Karbauskis revealed that he and his party is going to form the Shadow Cabinet.

On 11 February, Shadow Prime Minister Ramūnas Karbauskis announced his Shadow Cabinet.

On 17 June, Shadow Minister for Social Security and Labour Tomas Tomilinas was fired by Karbauskis, due to voting for a civil partnership law in Seimas, citing betrayal to voters of LVŽS.

Shadow Cabinet

References 

Government of Lithuania